Songhong Road is a station on Line 2 of the Shanghai Metro in Changning District. The station is still often used as a terminus for west-bound trains meaning passengers have to disembark and wait for another train for the remainder of the journey.

References

Shanghai Metro stations in Changning District
Line 2, Shanghai Metro
Railway stations in China opened in 2006
Railway stations in Shanghai